Charlie Bray (born September 23, 1945) is a former American football offensive lineman. He played 11 years of professional football in the Continental Football League, Canadian Football League (CFL), and World Football League (WFL)

Bray was born in Pittsburgh in 1945 and grew up in Pauls Valley, Oklahoma. He played college football at Pratt Community College and Central State in Oklahoma. He began playing professional football in the Continental Football League as a defensive tackle, offensive guard, and middle linebacker for the Orlando Panthers during the 1966 and 1967 seasons.

In 1958, he joined the Canadian Football League (CFL), playing for the Toronto Argonauts from 1968 to 1973 and the Hamilton Tiger Cats in 1976. He appeared in 75 CFL games. He was named to the All-CFL team in 1969 and 1970.

Bray also played for the Memphis Southmen of the World Football League in 1974 and 1975. He appeared in 31 WFL games.

References

1945 births
Living people
American football offensive guards
Toronto Argonauts players
Memphis Southmen players
Hamilton Tiger-Cats players
Players of American football from Oklahoma
Players of American football from Pittsburgh
Players of Canadian football from Pittsburgh